"Broken Promise Land" is a song written by Bill Rice and Sharon Vaughn, and recorded by American country music singer Waylon Jennings in 1985 for his album Turn the Page as "The Broken Promise Land". It was released as a single from Jennings' compilation album The Best of Waylon in December 1986. John Schneider recorded a cover of the song, also titled "The Broken Promise Land," on his 1986 album Take The Long Way Home on MCA Records. Then in 1990 Mark Chesnutt recorded a cover of the song. It was Chesnutt's fifth and final single released from his debut album Too Cold at Home. It peaked at number 10 in the United States, and number 7 in Canada in their respective country music charts.

Content
The song begins with the narrator and a woman he shouldn't be with in a motel room. He calls his wife, who believes he's on a business trip, out of guilt and tells her he'll be gone a bit longer. In the chorus the narrator refers to where he's at is called Broken Promise Land. When the narrator returns home, he finds his wife has left, her wedding ring on the floor. He says that she's going to Broken Promise Land as well.

Chart performance

Year-end charts

References

1985 songs
1986 singles
1991 singles
Waylon Jennings songs
John Schneider (screen actor) songs
Mark Chesnutt songs
Songs written by Bill Rice
Songs written by Sharon Vaughn
Song recordings produced by Mark Wright (record producer)
MCA Records singles
RCA Records singles